Ziggy Rozalski (born 1958) is a Polish American boxing manager and promoter. He represents Polish boxers Andrzej Gołota and Tomasz Adamek.

Life
In 1973 he moved to the United States from Poland.
He lives with his wife Diane and three children.
He owns multiple businesses and has become Poland's most successful boxing promoter.

References

Boxing managers
1954 births
Living people
American male boxers